The Emperor of Absurdia is a children's picture book written and illustrated by Chris Riddell, published in 2006. It won the Nestlé Children's Book Prize Silver Award and was shortlisted for the Kate Greenaway Medal.

References

2006 children's books
Children's fiction books
British children's books
British picture books